Clerke Island is an island about 1 km East of Cape Grenville in the Great Barrier Reef Marine Park, Queensland, Australia, in Temple Bay about 200 km north-east of Kutini-Payamu National Park and Lockhart River on the Cape York Peninsula. It is around 29 hectares or 0.29 square km in size.

This island is part of Home Islands.

References

Islands on the Great Barrier Reef
Uninhabited islands of Australia
Islands of Far North Queensland
Places in the Great Barrier Reef Marine Park